Mekongina is a genus of cyprinid fish found in Southeast Asia and China.

Species
There are currently three described species in this genus:
 Mekongina bibarba (V. H. Nguyễn, 2001)
 Mekongina erythrospila (Fowler, 1937)
 Mekongina lancangensis (Jian Yang, X. Y. Chen & J. X. Yang, 2008)

References

Labeoninae
Freshwater fish of Asia
Taxa named by Henry Weed Fowler